Guga River is a river of Papua New Guinea. It is part of the Wahgi River network.

References

Rivers of Papua New Guinea